Black Balsam Knob, also known as Black Balsam Bald, is in the Pisgah National Forest southwest of Asheville, North Carolina, near milepost 420 on the Blue Ridge Parkway. It is the second highest mountain in the Great Balsam Mountains. The Great Balsams are within the Blue Ridge Mountains, which are part of the Appalachian Mountains. It is the 23rd highest of the 40 mountains in North Carolina over 6000 feet.

The top of the mountain is a grassy bald that affords a panoramic view. The origin of grassy balds in southern Haywood county is a result of extensive clear-cut logging and locomotive fires in 1925 and 1942. These fires burned deep down into the mineral-rich topsoil slowing reforestation or stopping it altogether. Examples of this can also be found on many of its neighboring peaks and ridges. These features contribute to the area's popularity, but foot traffic also causes some ecological damage to the ecosystem. The Art Loeb Trail follows the grassy ridge of Black Balsam Knob.

Visible peaks from Black Balsam Knob include:
 Shining Rock in the Shining Rock Wilderness (3 miles northeast)
 Looking Glass Rock (5 miles southeast)
 Cold Mountain (6 miles north)
 Mount Pisgah (9.5 miles northeast)
 Mount Mitchell. On exceptionally clear days, Mount Mitchell, the highest point in the Eastern United States, is visible 45 miles north east.

Gallery

See also
 Art Loeb Trail
 Blue Ridge Parkway
 Pisgah National Forest

References

Mountains of North Carolina
Southern Sixers
Landmarks in North Carolina
Protected areas of Haywood County, North Carolina
Pisgah National Forest
Appalachian balds
Mountains of Haywood County, North Carolina
Articles containing video clips